1791 in sports describes the year's events in world sport.

Baseball
Earliest known reference
 The broken window by-law in Pittsfield, Massachusetts prohibited "baseball" and other ball games within 80 yards of the new meeting house, the earliest known reference to "baseball" in North America.

Boxing
Events
 17 January — "Big Ben" Brain defeated Tom Johnson at Wrotham in the 18th round of a fight lasting 21 minutes to claim the Championship of England. Brain held the title until his death from cirrhosis of the liver in 1794.

Cricket
Events
 
England
 Most runs – Billy Beldham 532
 Most wickets – Charles Cumberland 41

Horse racing
England
 The Derby – Eager
 The Oaks – Portia
 St Leger Stakes – Young Traveller

References

 
1791